"Mrs. God" is a song and single by German power metal band Helloween from their album Keeper of the Seven Keys: The Legacy. The song is about the emancipation of women, showing Helloween's sense of humour. It was written by the band's vocalist Andi Deris.

Track listing

Personnel
 Andi Deris - vocals
 Michael Weikath - lead guitar
 Sascha Gerstner - rhythm guitar
 Markus Grosskopf - bass
 Daniel Löble - drums

References

2005 singles
Helloween songs
Songs written by Andi Deris